Edward Twohig is a former Member of the Legislative Assembly of Nova Scotia, Canada for the constituency of Kings North. He sat as a member of the Progressive Conservative Party of Nova Scotia from 1978 to 1984.

Twohig was first elected in 1978, and was re-elected in 1981.  He did not re-offer in 1984.

References

Progressive Conservative Association of Nova Scotia MLAs
Living people
Year of birth missing (living people)